Shashi Sumeet Productions Pvt. Ltd. is an Indian company founded by Shashi Mittal and Sumeet Hukamchand Mittal which produces Indian soap operas, entertainment and reality programming on Indian television. Some of its notable works include: Diya Aur Baati Hum, Punar Vivah, Yeh Un Dinon Ki Baat Hai,  Barrister Babu, Meet: Badlegi Duniya Ki Reet.

Current productions

Former productions

Soap operas

Reality shows

References

Lists of Indian television series